Endemol Shine Australia is a part of Banijay, the world’s largest international content producer and distributor spanning 22 territories with over 120 production companies and a multi-genre catalogue boasting over 88,000 hours of original standout programming. Endemol Shine Australia is led by CEO, Peter Newman.

Based in Sydney, Endemol Shine Australia’s team comprises proven leaders in television and digital production whose shows have become ratings hits. Endemol Shine Australia’s slate represents the most exciting and popular programming on Australian free-to-air networks and pay TV channels – shows such as MasterChef, Australian Survivor, Big Brother, LEGO Masters, Australian Ninja Warrior, Married at First Sight, Gogglebox Australia and Ambulance Australia as well as acclaimed dramas including Offspring, Peter Allen: Not The Boy Next Door, and INXS: Never Tear Us Apart.

Following an acquisition of shares, production company Endemol Australia merged with Shine Australia on July 26, 2015.

They produce multiple Australian television programs across many networks, including popular franchise MasterChef Australia.

Endemol Shine Australia is also included in the current library from Hanna-Barbera Pty, Ltd./Taft-Hardie Group Pty. Ltd.

History 
In January 2010, Shine Australia was founded as a part of Shine Group, catering to the Australian and New Zealand market. It was jointly led by CEOs Mark Fennessy and Carl Fennessy, who had previously worked at FremantleMedia Australia and Crackerjack Productions. Shine Australia is not to be mistaken for the long-serving entertainment and talent company Shine International Entertainment, who own the registered trademark and have been operating in Australia since 1932.

On February 24, 2016, producer Imogen Banks began to head a new division of Endemol Shine Australia called EndemolShine Banks, which will be used for drama productions.

In 2020, Peter Newman was announced as the Chief Executive Officer.

Productions 
 Programs with a shaded background indicate the program is still in production.

External links 
 Official Website

See also 
 Shine Group
 Shine Limited
 Shine America

References 

Television production companies of Australia
Banijay
Australian companies established in 2010 
Mass media companies established in 2010
Australian subsidiaries of foreign companies
Companies based in Sydney